Brown Lake is a lake that is located east of Arietta, New York. Fish species present in the lake are brook trout, and brown bullhead. There is access by trail and no motors are allowed on the lake.

References

Lakes of New York (state)
Lakes of Hamilton County, New York